András Haán (19 June 1946 – 5 January 2021) was a Hungarian sportsman. He competed in the men's basketball tournament at the 1964 Summer Olympics in Tokyo. He also competed in the sailing at the 1976 Summer Olympics in Montreal.

References

External links
 

1946 births
2021 deaths
Hungarian men's basketball players
Hungarian male sailors (sport)
Olympic basketball players of Hungary
Olympic sailors of Hungary
Basketball players at the 1964 Summer Olympics
Sailors at the 1976 Summer Olympics – Finn
Basketball players from Budapest